The 1909–10 Drake Bulldogs men's basketball team represented Drake University in the 1909–10 college basketball season. The team was led by first year head coach John L. Griffith. This was also Drake's third season as a member of the Missouri Valley Intercollegiate Athletic Association. They finished with a 3–8 (3–5 MVIAA) record the previous season. That had them finishing 3rd of 3 teams in the MVIAA North Division.

Schedule

Notes

Drake Bulldogs
Drake Bulldogs men's basketball seasons
Drake Bulldogs men's basketball
Drake Bulldogs men's basketball